Eljo Ernesto Ignatius Polikarpus Iba (born December 17, 1991) is an Indonesian professional footballer who plays as a right back for Liga 2 club Persipura Jayapura. His older brother, Erol Iba is a former footballer for Indonesia national team.

Club career

Persiba Balikpapan
Eljo Iba joined the Persiba Balikpapan club in the 2020 Liga 2. This season was suspended on 27 March 2020 due to the COVID-19 pandemic. The season was abandoned and was declared void on 20 January 2021.

References

External links 
 Eljo Iba at Soccerway
 Eljo Iba at Liga Indonesia

1991 births
Living people
Indonesian footballers
Liga 2 (Indonesia) players
Association football midfielders
Gresik United players
Bhayangkara F.C. players
Persewar Waropen players
Persiba Balikpapan players
People from Jayapura
Sportspeople from Papua